Anata to no Hibi (The Days with You) is Jun Shibata's 7th and best selling single up to date. It is also her first single to break into the Top 10. It was released on September 10, 2003, and peaked at #8.

Track listing
Anata to no hibi (あなたとの日々; The Days with You)
Kan beer (缶ビール; Can Beer)

Charts

External links
https://web.archive.org/web/20161030094458/http://www.shibatajun.com/— Shibata Jun Official Website

2003 singles
Jun Shibata songs
2003 songs